Everett's tree frog or the Timor tree frog (Litoria everetti) is a species of frog in the subfamily Pelodryadinae.  The scientific name commemorates the British colonial administrator and zoological collector Alfred Hart Everett.

Distribution and habitat
It is found on the Indonesian islands of on Alor, Sumba, Sawu, and in both Indonesian West Timor and independent Timor-Leste.  Its natural habitats are subtropical or tropical dry forests, subtropical or tropical dry shrubland, rivers, intermittent rivers, freshwater marshes, and intermittent freshwater marshes.

References

Litoria
Fauna of Timor
Amphibians described in 1897
Taxonomy articles created by Polbot